The 14th Parliament of Jamaica was sworn in on 15 September 2020, after being elected following the 2020 Jamaican general election.

Crown 
 Governor-General Sir Patrick Allen

Senate 
Jamaica Labour Party:
 Kamina Johnson Smith
 Matthew Samuda
 Aubyn Hill
 Leslie Campbell
 Tom Tavares-Finson, OJ, QC, JP
 Kavan Gayle
 Ransford Braham, QC
 Charles Sinclair Jr.
 Donald Wehby
 Delroy Williams
 Dr. Saphire Longmore
 Natalie Campbell Rodriques
 Sherene Golding Campbell

People's National Party:
 Donna Scott-Mottley, Leader of Opposition Business in the Senator
 Dr. Floyd Morris
 Sophia Fraser Binns
 Damion Crawford 
 Peter Bunting *
 Lambert Brown
 Janice Allen
 Gabriella Morris

* Appointed after Norman Horne turned down the appointment made by then People's National Party Opposition Leader Dr. Peter Phillips.

House of Representatives

Government – Jamaica Labour Party members 

 The Most Hon. Andrew Holness, ON – Saint Andrew West Central - Prime Minister
 Dr. The Hon. Horace Chang, CD, Saint James North Western - Deputy Prime Minister
 Hon. Marisa Dalrymple-Philibert, Trelawny Southern – Speaker
 Mrs. Juliet Holness, Saint Andrew East Rural – Deputy Speaker
 Hon. Edmund Bartlett, Saint James East Central – Leader of Government Business
 Hon. Pearnel Patroe Charles Jr., Clarendon South Eastern
 Hon. Robert Nesta Morgan, Sr. Clarendon North Central
 Mr. Lester Michael Henry, OJ, Clarendon Central
 Mr. Phillip Henriques, Clarendon North Western
 Mr. Dwight Sibblies, Clarendon Northern
 Mr. Dave Brown, Hanover Eastern
 Ms. Tamika Davis, Hanover Western
 Hon. Desmond McKenzie, Kingston Western
 Mr. Donovan Williams, Kingston Central
 Hon. Audley Shaw, Manchester North Eastern
 Ms. Rhoda Moy-Crawford, Manchester Central
 Mr. Robert Chin, Manchester Southern
 Hon. Daryl Vaz, Portland Western
 Mrs. Ann-Marie Vaz, Portland Eastern
 Hon. Fayval Williams, Saint Andrew Eastern
 Dr. The Hon. Nigel Clarke, Saint Andrew North Western
 Hon. Karl Samuda, Saint Andrew North Central
 Hon. Delroy Chuck, QC, Saint Andrew North Eastern
 Hon. Juliet Cuthbert-Flynn, Saint Andrew West Rural
 Hon. Zavia Mayne, Saint Ann South Western
 Hon. Marsha Smith, Saint Ann North Eastern
 Ms. Krystal Lee, Saint Ann North Western
 Hon. Clifford Everald Warmington, Saint Catherine South Western
 Dr. The Hon. Christopher Tufton, Saint Catherine West Central
 Hon. Olivia Grange, Saint Catherine Central
 Hon. Alando Terrelonge, Saint Catherine East Central
 Mr. Robert Miller, Saint Catherine South Eastern
 Ms. Kerensia Morrison, Saint Catherine North Eastern
 Dr. Andrew Wheatley, Saint Catherine South Central
 Hon. Floyd Green, Saint Elizabeth South Western
 Hon. William James Charles Hutchinson, Saint Elizabeth North Western
 Mr. Franklyn Witter, Saint Elizabeth South Eastern
 Mr. Delroy Slowley, Saint Elizabeth North Eastern
 Hon. Homer Davis, Saint James Southern
 Mr. Heroy Clarke, Saint James Central
 Hon. Marlene Malahoo Forte, QC, Saint James West Central
 Hon. Robert Montague, Saint Mary Western
 Dr. The Hon. Norman Alexander Dunn, Saint Mary South Eastern
 Mr. James Robertson, Saint Thomas Western
 Dr. Michelle Charles, Saint Thomas Eastern
 Ms. Tova Hamilton, Trelawny Northern
 Mr. Daniel Lawrence, Westmoreland Eastern
 Mr. Morland Wilson, Westmoreland Western

Opposition – People's National Party members 

 Mr. Mark Golding, Saint Andrew Southern – Leader of the Opposition
 Mr. Phillip Paulwell, Kingston East and Port Royal – Leader of Opposition Business
 Dr. Morais Guy, Saint Mary Central
 Dr. Peter Phillips, Saint Andrew East Central
 Dr. Angela Brown-Burke, Saint Andrew South West
 Mr. Lothan Cousins, Clarendon South Western
 Ms. Denise Daley, Saint Catherine Eastern
 Mr. Julian Robinson, Saint Andrew South Eastern
 Mr. G. Anthony Hylton, Saint Andrew Western
 Mr. Fitz Jackson, Saint Catherine Southern
 Ms. Natalie Neita, Saint Catherine North Central
 Mr. Mikael Phillips, Manchester North Western
 Hon. Hugh Graham, Saint Catherine North Western
 Ms. Lisa Hanna, Saint Ann South Eastern

Independents 

 Mr. George Wright, Westmoreland Central

References 

Jamaica

2020s in Jamaica
Parliament of Jamaica

Parliament of Jamaica